Abdulkadir Abukar Mohamed (born 1 January 1999) is a Finnish footballer who plays as a midfielder.

Club career
Mohamed was born in Mogadishu, Somalia, but at 3 years old emigrated to Tampere with his parents. Mohamed started his career in Finland with TPV U19 and then went on to play for TPS. In 2017 Mohamed got signed by Lazio. In July 2019 signed a one year loan deal with Ukrainian side FC Karpaty Lviv.

References

External links
 
 

1999 births
Living people
Sportspeople from Mogadishu
Finnish footballers
Somalian footballers
Finland youth international footballers
Finnish expatriate footballers
Expatriate footballers in Ukraine
Finnish expatriate sportspeople in Ukraine
Association football midfielders
S.S. Lazio players
FC Karpaty Lviv players
Kakkonen players
Ykkönen players
Finnish people of Somali descent
Ukrainian Premier League players